Benson Veteran Cycle Museum is a private museum of veteran cycles in the village of Benson near Wallingford in Oxfordshire, England.

The museum has over 500 cycles dating from 1818 to 1930, with associated documentation and records. The museum is open by appointment. There is a Benson Veteran Cycle Club annual rally on the first Sunday of July each year.

See also
 Museum of Oxford
 History of the bicycle
 History of cycling
 List of museums in Oxfordshire

References

External links
 Benson Veteran Cycle Museum website

Museums with year of establishment missing
Cycling museums and halls of fame
Transport museums in England
History museums in Oxfordshire
South Oxfordshire District